Grauer's large-headed shrew (Paracrocidura graueri) is a species of mammal in the family Soricidae. It is endemic to the Democratic Republic of the Congo. Its natural habitat is subtropical or tropical moist montane forests.

References 

Paracrocidura
Endemic fauna of the Democratic Republic of the Congo
Taxonomy articles created by Polbot
Mammals described in 1986